Price Glacier is in North Cascades National Park in the U.S. state of Washington, on the northeast slopes of Mount Shuksan, below the subpeak known as Nooksack Tower. The disconnected lowest portions of Price Glacier calve small icebergs into Price Lake.

See also
List of glaciers in the United States

References

Glaciers of the North Cascades
Glaciers of Whatcom County, Washington
Glaciers of Washington (state)